Rate Furlan (1911–1989) was an Italian actor, composer, screenwriter and film director.

Selected filmography
 La figlia della Madonna (1949)
 Lo Zappatore (1950)
 Malavita (1951)
 Melody of Love (1952)
 Arrivederci Firenze (1958)
 The Huns (1960)
 Antonio Gramsci: The Days of Prison (1977)
 The Belly of an Architect (1987)

References

Bibliography
 Chiti, Roberto & Poppi, Roberto. Dizionario del cinema italiano: Dal 1945 al 1959. Gremese Editore, 1991.

External links

1911 births
1989 deaths
Italian film directors
Italian male film actors
Italian screenwriters
People from Padua
20th-century Italian screenwriters